Pigweed can mean any of a number of weedy plants which may be used as pig fodder:

 Amaranthus species
 Amaranthus albus, white pigweed, tumble pigweed 
 Amaranthus blitoides, prostrate pigweed
 Amaranthus californicus, California pigweed
 Amaranthus fimbriatus, fringed pigweed
 Amaranthus hybridus, smooth pigweed
 Amaranthus palmeri, the 'pigweed' resistant to glyphosate in the US Southeast
 Amaranthus retroflexus, redroot pigweed
 Chenopodium album white goosefoot
 Polygonum aviculare
 Portulaca species

See also
Hogweed